Divya Sesha Iyer (born 16 October 1984) is an Indian bureaucrat, medical doctor, editor, and author who is part of the Indian Administrative Service in Kerala. She is the current District Collector of Pathanamthitta. She was the Mission Director of Mahatma Gandhi NREGA.

Early life and education
Iyer was born on 16 October 1984. She hails from Thiruvananthapuram, Kerala. She is the elder daughter of Sesha Iyer, who is a retired Indian Space Research Organisation employee, and Bhagavathy Ammal, a State Bank of Travancore employee. 

Iyer did her schooling at Holy Angel's Convent Trivandrum. She scored second rank in SSLC examination conducted by Kerala Board of Public Examinations.<ref>{{cite news |title='മിടുക്കിയായി പഠിച്ച് ഐഎഎസ് നേടണം; പഠിക്കും, ഡോക്ടറാകും, ഐഎഎസ്സും|author=മിന്റു പി. ജേക്കബ്|url=https://www.manoramaonline.com/news/latest-news/2022/01/26/collector-divya-s-iyer-minister-antony-raju-and-an-ias-link.amp.html |access-date=February 1, 2022 |work=Malayala Manorama |date=January 27, 2022 |language=ml}}</ref> She completed her 11th and 12th from the St. Thomas Central School, Trivandrum. She then got her medical degree from the Christian Medical College Vellore.

Career
Iyer was a doctor before she began her civil service career and continues to practice medicine. She joined IAS in 2014 and was assistant collector at Kottayam before becoming Sub-Collector of Trivandrum.
 
In 2016, as the nodal officer of Systematic Voter Education and Electoral Participation (SVEEP) under the Election Commission and assistant collector in Kottayam, Iyer created a voter awareness campaign with the motto "My Vote My Future" to help improve voter turnout. In 2016, she also wrote and sang the song 'Viral thumbil Nammude Bhaavi' to promote awareness of voting rights and to encourage voting, which was released during a press conference by the District Collector.

In 2018, Iyer was transferred from her role as Sub-Collector to Deputy Secretary in the Local Self-Government Department.
Mission Director of the Mahatma Gandhi NREGA

Iyer then served as the Mission Director of the Mahatma Gandhi National Rural Employment Guarantee Scheme (MNREGS). In this role, she was named one of the Kerala Insider'' 50 Most Influential People of 2020, due to her prominent role in the #BreakTheChain awareness campaign during the COVID-19 pandemic.

District Collector

On 12 July 2021, Iyer became the 36th district collector of Pathanamthitta. In August 2021, she said she plans to continue measures to address the COVID-19 pandemic, as well as development of the district and measures that promote the empowerment of women.

In 2021, following the decision of the State government to award title deeds to farmers in Konni following decades of protests, Iyer prepared and submitted a report with forest division officers as part of the process to distribute the deeds.

In December 2021, Iyer distributed gender neutral school uniforms to the students of Government Tribal LP School Attathodu in Ranni of Pathanamthitta district in Kerala.

In 2021 and 2022, Iyer and district police chief R Nishanthini helped coordinate the annual Sabarimala pilgrimage, and did not attempt to enter the temple.

Divya enthralled students of Catholicate College by taking part in their flash mob held as part of the MG University Union Arts Festival.

Published works

Filmography

Discography

Personal life
 
On 30 June 2017, Iyer married Congress MLA representing Aruvikkara constituency, K. S. Sabarinadhan in Kumarakovil, a temple at Thuckalay in Kanyakumari district, becoming the first MLA-IAS couple in Kerala. On 9 March 2019, she gave birth to a baby boy.

G. Karthikeyan, former Minister and speaker of the Kerala Legislative Assembly is her father-in-law.

References

External links

 Divyas' Ted talk video about her career (YouTube)

1984 births
Living people
21st-century Indian medical doctors
21st-century Indian writers
People from Thiruvananthapuram
Indian women medical doctors
Indian writers
Medical doctors from Kerala
Indian Administrative Service officers from Kerala
Civil Servants from Kerala
District magistrate
Malayalam-language writers
21st-century Indian women writers